Pepe Iglesias (February 11, 1915 in Buenos Aires – March 4, 1991 in Santiago de Chile), full name José Ángel Iglesias Sánchez, nicknamed El Zorro (The Fox), was an Argentine comedian, who, though he developed much of his career in his home country, also spent time in Chile and Spain.
At the 1945 Argentine Film Critics Association Awards Iglesias won the Silver Condor Award for Best Actor in a Comic Role for his performance in Mi novia es un fantasma (1944).

Biography
Son of Spanish immigrants, he developed his career in his native land of Argentina, before settling in Spain in May 1952. Soon after, he made his debut with the Spanish public through a local radio station in Barcelona.
The following year, he appeared Ramon Torrado's film Que Loco!, alongside Pepe Isbert and Emma Penella.
He was then signed by Cadena SER and became one of Spain's best paid radio stars. Endowed with an uncanny ability to play different voices, attributed to different people, like 'Don Tapadera' and 'Finado Fernández' who was one of the most popular. All of these were living in the imaginary One Bed Hotel (where there is anger all week). Iglesias, under the nickname 'The Fox' became one of the comics par excellence of the Spanish 50s.
The taglines of his shows soon passed into everyday language, and it became common to hear one, followed by a whistled theme tune.
With the advent of television in Spain, Iglesias tried his luck at the new media (Gran Parada). However, his form of linguistic comedy did not survive the adaptations necessary for the changing times.

Films

References

External links 
 
 
 
 .

1915 births
1991 deaths
Argentine male film actors
Argentine comedians
Burials at La Chacarita Cemetery
20th-century Argentine male actors
Argentine male radio actors
20th-century comedians